Richard Edwin Tuffrey Morris (born 28 January 1947) is a former South African cricketer. He played 61 first-class and 14 List A matches for Western Province cricket team between 1967 and 1979 as an all-rounder.

Notes

1947 births
Living people
South African cricketers
Western Province cricketers